The Man Who Invented the Computer is a 2010 historical biography by author Jane Smiley about American physicist John Vincent Atanasoff and the invention of the computer. The book follows Atanasoff as he collaborates with others to develop the Atanasoff–Berry Computer (ABC), the first electronic digital computing device.

See also
 List of pioneers in computer science

External links
Official site
After Words interview with Smiley on The Man Who Invented the Computer, December 27, 2010

American biographies
History books about scientific discoveries
Doubleday (publisher) books
2010 non-fiction books